The  is a German high-wing, cable-braced, single-seat primary glider that was designed by Schneider, Rehberg and Hofmann at Edmund Schneider's factory at Grunau in 1938, hence the designation. It was produced by several builders, including Deutsche Forschungsanstalt für Segelflug (DFS).

Design and development
The SG 38 was designed to be a training glider for basic flight training by the Nationalsozialistisches Fliegerkorps (NSFK). The usual launch method was by bungee cord from a sloped hill. Because training was conducted solely by solo flight the aircraft had to be very easy to fly and also easy to repair.

The high-wing design uses a kingpost and cable bracing. The primary structure of the glider is of wood, with the wings, tail surfaces and inverted "V" kingpost all finished in doped aircraft fabric covering. The pilot sits on a simple seat in the open air, without a windshield.

The basic configuration was similar to earlier gliders such as the Stamer Lippisch Zögling and the Grunau IX, but the SG 38 was an entirely new design. Improvements included enlarged tail surfaces for better stability, a separate skid mounted on shock-absorbing springs, and an updated seat for the pilot.

Licence production
The SG-38 was built in Japan as the Tachikawa Ki-24.

Operational history

The SG-38 played a critical role in pilot training for the Luftwaffe in the Second World War, as a simple, but robust, trainer for the rapid increase in the number of pilots needed by Germany. It was commonly flown by bungee launch on the slopes of the Wasserkuppe.

From 1949 to 1951 Spain's AISA produced 50 licence-built aircraft.

In the UK, Elliotts of Newbury built a copy of the SG.38 called the Elliotts Primary EoN; its version first flown in 1948 and used by the RAF as the Eton TX.1.

Aircraft on display
Danmarks Flymuseum, Stauning Vestjylland Airport, Denmark
Deutsches Museum, Munich, Germany
Museo del Aire, Madrid, Spain
 Musée de l'Air et de l'Espace, Paris – Le Bourget Airport, France
Museu do Ar, Sintra, Portugal
National Museum of the United States Air Force, Dayton, Ohio, USA
Shuttleworth Collection, Old Warden, Bedfordshire, England

Specifications (SG 38)

See also

Images

References

1930s German sailplanes
SG 38 Schulgleiter
Articles containing video clips
Aircraft first flown in 1938
Glider aircraft
High-wing aircraft
Edmund Schneider aircraft